Criorhina bomboides is a species of hoverfly in the family Syrphidae.

Distribution
India.

References

Eristalinae
Diptera of Asia
Insects described in 1944
Taxa named by Frank Montgomery Hull